Izu Ojukwu  is a Nigerian film director. In 2007 he won Best Director for Sitanda at the 3rd Africa Movie Academy Awards, which received nine nominations and won five awards at the event, including Best Picture and Best Nigerian Film.

Selected filmography (as director)
Amina (2021)
 Power of One (2018)
'76 (2016)
Alero's Symphony (2010)
The Child (2009)
Nnenda (2009)
Distance Between (2008)
Cindy's Note (2008)
White Waters (2007)
Laviva (2007)
Sitanda (2006)
3rd Africa Movie Academy Awards 2007 for Best Director
GL 1 & 2 (2005)
Across the Niger (2003)
Moving Train (2003)
Battle of Love (2003)
Desperadoes 1 & 2 (2001)
Eleventh Hour (2001)
Love Boat (2001)
The World is Mine (2001)
Showdown (2000)
Iva (1999)
Icabod (1993)

See also
 List of Nigerian film producers

References

External links

Living people
Best Director Africa Movie Academy Award winners
Year of birth missing (living people)
Nigerian film directors